Florian Stork (born 27 April 1997) is a German cyclist, who currently rides for UCI WorldTeam .

Major results
2016
 5th Time trial, National Under-23 Road Championships
2018
 5th Time trial, National Under-23 Road Championships
 5th Overall Tour Alsace
2019
 2nd Time trial, National Under-23 Road Championships
 3rd Poreč Trophy
 7th Overall Istrian Spring Trophy

References

External links

1997 births
Living people
German male cyclists
People from Herford (district)
Sportspeople from Detmold (region)
Cyclists from North Rhine-Westphalia